Who Covers Who? is a tribute album to the rock band The Who. It was released in 1993 in the UK and the following year in the US.

Track listing
 "I Can See For Miles" - Hyperhead
 "Pictures of Lily" - Ian McLagan & The Bump Band
 "The Kids Are Alright" - The Revs
 "Bargain" - The Buck Pets
 "Boris the Spider" - Mint 400
 "The Good's Gone" - The Telescopes
 "In the City" - Swervedriver
 "Anyway, Anyhow, Anywhere" - Alex Chilton
 "Substitute" - Blur
 "Baba O'Riley" - Hinnies
 "Glowgirl" - Mess
 "The Good's Gone" (Slight reprise) - The Brilliant Corners

Personnel
Caruzo Fuller - Compiler
John Yates - Compiler

References

1993 albums
The Who tribute albums